The 1980 BYU Cougars football team represented Brigham Young University (BYU) for the 1980 NCAA Division I-A football season. The Cougars were led by ninth-year head coach LaVell Edwards and played their home games at Cougar Stadium in Provo, Utah. The team competed as a member of the Western Athletic Conference, winning their fifth consecutive conference title with a conference record of 6–1. After a season-opening loss to New Mexico, BYU ended on a 12-game winning streak, including a victory over SMU in the 1980 Holiday Bowl, finishing 12–1 overall and ranked 12th in the final AP Poll. The Cougars' offense scored 606 points during the season for an average of 46.6 points per game. They scored over 50 points in a game five times, including two games scoring over 70 points.

Schedule

Personnel

Season summary

San Diego State

Source: Palm Beach Post

Long Beach State

    
    
    
    
    
    
    
    
    
    

BYU: Jim McMahon 339 Yds passing

Wyoming

Wyoming came into the contest with a wishbone attack that was fourth in the nation in rushing and sixth in total offense at 450 yards per game while BYU featured the nation's second best passing squad behind Jim McMahon, the best statistical passer in the country.

McMahon finished 22 of 31 for 408 yards and four touchdowns, his fourth straight game over 300 yards to keep his number one ranking. Wyoming attempted to rush seven and eight at McMahon but the offensive line and backs, normally featured in the passing game, did a superb job blocking. McMahon was never sacked as Nick Eyre, Lloyd Eldredge, Bart Oates, Calvin Close and Ray Linford dominated the line of scrimmage for the Cougars.

With the Cowboys committing to the pass rush, McMahon threw at will to targets Dan Plater (8 receptions for 99 yards and a touchdown), Lloyd Jones (5/120, TD), Bill Davis (7/143, TD) and Clay Brown (2/61, TD), who faced one-on-one coverage and exploit this advantage.

Meanwhile, BYU's defense was just as dominating, consistently getting into the Wyoming backfield and limiting the wishbone options for a team that came in averaging 323 yards on the ground. With the defensive line of Glen Titensor, Mike Morgan, Chuck Ehin, Pulusila Filiaga and Brad Anae shutting down the run, all the likes of Glen Redd, Kyle Whittingham, Bob Prested and Ed St. Pierre had to do was clean up.

The game was decided in the first quarter as BYU scored on two of its first three possessions and Wyoming gained 30 yards rushing in four. By halftime, BYU led 17-3 and the Cowboys had only increased their rushing total to 42.

"I've never seen a team compare with BYU throwing the football and I don't believe we've seen anyone physically as tough. BYU is much stronger than we are", Wyoming head coach Pat Dye said.

Dye continued, "McMahon is a great quarterback. We knew the four-man rush wouldn't get to them, so we tried different things. Today, a four-man rush or a seven-man rush didn't make any difference."

at Utah

BYU clinched its third straight Holiday Bowl berth and its fifth straight Western Athletic Conference title with the victory over their in-state rivals. Jim McMahon completed 21 of 34 passes for 399 yards, an NCAA record tenth straight game over 300 yards passing. McMahon also broke San Diego State's Dennis Shaw's 1969 single-season touchdown pass record of 39 with his first scoring toss and later surpassed Shaw for most total touchdowns in a single season (45).

Holiday Bowl

References

BYU
BYU Cougars football seasons
Western Athletic Conference football champion seasons
Holiday Bowl champion seasons
BYU Cougars football